The RS Feva is a two-person sailing dinghy designed by Paul Handley in 2002. It is manufactured and distributed by RS Sailing. The RS Feva is an International Sailing Federation (ISAF) International Class, a Royal Yachting Association (RYA) Supported Junior Class, and has been selected by the Dansk Sejlunion (Danish Sailing Association) and Norges Seilforbund (Norwegian Sailing Federation) for major sailing growth projects.

Performance and design
The RS Feva is available in two versions; the RS Feva S and RS Feva XL.

The RS Feva S is the pleasure-sailing version, with a "soft" unbattened mainsail and can be upgraded to add a jib and/or gennaker.

The RS Feva XL is the racing version, with the same hull and spars as the RS Feva S but the sail package comprises a full-battened mylar racing mainsail and includes the jib and gennaker. The design allows both the jib and gennaker to be used at the same time for power reaching. When racing in a mixed fleet, the RS Feva XL uses a Portsmouth Yardstick handicap of 1210 in the UK or 105.2 in the USA.

The boat is suitable to be sailed by two young sailors or by adult and child teams, the RS Feva may also be sailed single-handed.

The RS Feva is popular in Europe, Australia and Hong Kong, and is being re-introduced to the market in North America.

In the United Kingdom the RS Feva has been approved by the RYA for the RYA OnBoard scheme, and by schools (e.g. Claires Court School, Oakham School, Sevenoaks School ), sailing centres and clubs (e.g. Hayling Island Sailing Club and Hill Head Sailing Club) for their junior sailing programmes.

International recognition and support
The RS Feva has International Sailing Federation (ISAF) International Class status.
The RS Feva has won the Coup de Coeur Award in France.
The RS Feva has previously won the Dinghy of the Year Award in the USA.
The RS Feva is a Royal Yachting Association (RYA) Supported Junior Class.

RS Feva owners and sailors around the World are supported by an International Class Association and a network of National Class Associations which organise the World, European and National Championships.

World Championships

European Championships

National Championships

United Kingdom

Other

References

External links
 RS Sailing
 International RS Feva Class Association

Classes of World Sailing
Dinghies
2000s sailboat type designs
Sailboat type designs by Paul Handley
Sailboat types built by RS Sailing